Ermoceras is a genus of ammonite belonging to the  Thomboceratidae family of the Middle Jurassic ( u Baj) found in deposites of central Arabia, Sinai, and Algeria with strong primary and secondary ribs and a single row of lateral tubercles; described as having a deep ventral groove 

Telermoceras, with low, depressed whorls, and Kosmermoceras with high, compressed whorls are considered subgenera of Ermoceras   Both are from the same time and region. Telermoceras has coarse secondary ribs and a deep umbilicus surrounded by large tubercles or spines. Kosmermocerashas fine sharp to coarse ribbing and a flattish venter

Ermoceras s.l. is derived from Arkelloceras. Westermann (1965) tentatively placed Ermoceras in the Thamboceratidae, based on sutural morphology, removing it from the Stephanoceratidae where it was previously included.

References

Jurassic ammonites
Jurassic animals of Africa
Bajocian life
Ammonitida genera
Stephanoceratoidea